Dinara Safina and Meghann Shaughnessy were the defending champions, but did not compete together this year.

Shaughnessy partnered with Anna-Lena Grönefeld, and lost to Li Na and Peng Shuai in the first round. Safina partnered with Katarina Srebotnik, and won in the final 6–3, 6–4, against Iveta Benešová and Galina Voskoboeva.

Seeds

  Cara Black   Liezel Huber (semifinals)
  Dinara Safina   Katarina Srebotnik (champions)
  Anna-Lena Grönefeld   Meghann Shaughnessy (first round)
  Maria Kirilenko   Shahar Pe'er (quarterfinals)

Draw

Draw

External links
Main Draw and Qualifying draw

Doubles